An e-reader, also known as an e-book reader, is a portable electronic device that is designed primarily for the purpose of reading e-books and periodicals. E-readers have a similar form factor to a tablet and usually refers to devices that use electronic paper resulting in better screen readability, especially in bright sunlight, and longer battery life when compared to a tablet. An e-reader's battery will typically last for multiple weeks. In contrast to an e-reader, a tablet has a screen capable of higher refresh rates which make them more suitable for interaction such as playing a video game or watching a video clip.

Types of electronic-paper displays

All electronic paper types offer lower power consumption and better sunlight contrast than LCDs. Some offer a backlight to allow low-light reading. With the backlight turned off, all have a similar appearance to "ink on paper" and are readable in bright environments.
 E ink: E Ink Corporation's 1st-generation technology, also known as E Ink Vizplex. Although "eInk" may be used to talk about all electronic paper displays, "eInk" and "E Ink" are trademarked by E Ink, which provides the majority of the electronic paper displays used in devices.
 E Ink Pearl: E Ink's 2nd-generation technology, which has higher contrast and a greater number of different levels of gray than their earlier technology. A further revision of Pearl is Mobius, which uses flexible plastic in the display.
 E Ink Triton: E Ink's 3rd-generation technology that featured the ability to show color in the display.
 E Ink Carta: E Ink's 4th-generation technology, which has higher contrast and a greater number of different levels of gray than their earlier technology; the displays have a pixel density between 212 and 300 ppi.
 SiPix: A former competitor to E Ink, which had displays with almost instantaneous page turns. It was acquired by E Ink in December 2012.
 LG Flex: Electronic paper that allows a flexible screen; is still in development. With these displays, the user is able to bend the e-reader without damaging it and can fold it up to put in a pocket.

Electronic-paper readers come in various sizes.

Commercially available devices sold by maker or designer 

Notes:
 Library DRM compatible – Can be used to borrow e-books from public libraries, e.g. the EPUB and/or PDF formats with digital-rights-management (DRM) are supported.
 "microSDHC" is the most popular format for external memory cards. Devices which support a different card have that format listed.
 Listed are only products for which either the product itself or its company is notable, as shown by having a Wikipedia article (without notability notice).

Electronic-paper displays

Private label hardware
Some common hardware is resold in different national markets under various brand names. Below is the list of identical hardware:
 manufacturer device name→ screen model, compatible screen models (first is better) → rebranded devices
 Boeye C60 → ED060SCE(LF), ED060SC7(LF) → Gmini MagicBook Z6, Digma E605, DigmaE625
 Boeye G6 → ? → Amazon Kindle 2
 Boeye G10 → ED097OC4(LF) → Amazon Kindle DX
 Hanlin V3 → ED060SC8, ED060SC9, ED060SC4(LF), LB060S02-RD01, LB060S01-RD02 → BeBook : BeBook, Koobe, Astak EZ Reader, Lbook V3, Papyre 6.1 (E1/E2)
 Hanlin V60 → ED060SC8, ED060SC9, ED060SC4(LF), LB060S02-RD01, LB060S01-RD02 or ED060SC7(LF), ED060SCE(LF) → LBook V60 (white or black), Papyre 613 (v1 or v2), E-Reader Onda Biblet TB600KT con WiFi e 3G, Koobe Be Free
 ? → 6" → Netronix EB001, Astak Mentor EZ Reader, Cybook Gen3 (200 MHz version)
 ? → 6" → Netronix EB600, Cool-er, eClicto, Elonex eBook, eSlick, Astaka Mentor EZ Reader, Cybook Gen3 (400 MHz version)
 ? → 6" → Condor eGriver touch, Medion OYO, Prestigio PER5062B, Icarus Sense, Pandigital Novel 6" Personal eReader, Qisda QD060B00
 ? → 6" → TrekStor eBook Reader 3.0, Prestigio Nobile PER3172B
 ? → ED060SC7(LF) → Papyre 601, Wexler E6003, Prology Latitude I-601, Ritmix RBK-600, Assistant AE-601, DNS Airbook EYT601, Texet TB-146
 ? → ED060SCE(LF) → Qumo Libro Basic, Woxter Paperlight 300
 ? → 6" SiPix Touchscreen display, 800x600px, 167ppi, 16 levels of grayscale → bq Movistar, bq Avant, egriver Touch (India), postitivo Alfa (Brazil), e-vrit (Israel), Papyre 6.2 (Spain).

Discontinued models

File format support 
See Comparison of e-book formats for details on the file formats.

The most notable formats are:
 .epub is a free and open e-book standard used by most e-readers.
 .azw is Amazon's first proprietary e-book file format used in Kindles.

This list is missing many of the 1st and 2nd generation e-reader devices from the 1990s to 2005.

This list could be expanded by adding Unicode support information for e-readers.

Other mobile text viewers 

 All modern (Windows Mobile, iOS, Android, BlackBerry, Linux) smartphones, tablets and other generic computing devices have e-book reading software.
 Some portable multimedia players and older phones include a text viewer, e.g. several Cowon players, including the Cowon D2 and the iAUDIO U3 and Mobipocket Reader for Symbian OS. Palm OS based devices and smartphones are also usable for reading books. Palm OS supports PalmDoc, iSilo, Mobipocket reader, PDF, HTML conversion, text format, Handstory, TealDoc among many other software titles, and word processing.

See also 
 Comparison of tablet computers
 Dedicated ebook devices – Wikipedia category listing e-readers with their own articles
 Comparison of ebook formats – includes both device and software formats
 Comparison of Android e-reader software – includes software e-readers for Android devices
 Comparison of iOS e-reader software – includes software e-readers for iOS devices

References

External links 

 E-Reader Matrix on MobileRead Wiki
 

Electronic paper technology
Computing comparisons

e-readers